Ixora panurensis is a species of shrub or tree in the family Rubiaceae. It is native to South America.

References

panurensis
Trees of Peru